Drillia idalinae is a species of sea snail, a marine gastropod mollusk in the family Drilliidae.

Description
The size of an adult shell varies between 20 mm and 35 mm.

Distribution
This species occurs in the demersal zone of the Atlantic Ocean off Gabon and São Tomé and Principe.

References

  Tucker, J.K. 2004 Catalog of recent and fossil turrids (Mollusca: Gastropoda). Zootaxa 682:1–1295
 Bernard, P.A. (Ed.) (1984). Coquillages du Gabon [Shells of Gabon]. Pierre A. Bernard: Libreville, Gabon. 140, 75 plates pp.

External links
 

idalinae
Gastropods described in 1984
Invertebrates of Gabon
Invertebrates of São Tomé and Príncipe